Zonopteroides diversus is a species of longhorn beetle endemic to Sri Lanka.

References 

Cerambycinae
Insects of Sri Lanka
Insects described in 1906